Benson Street is a former train station in a residential section of the town of Glen Ridge, New Jersey.

History

The station was constructed in 1883 in a unique English Tudor design with stucco facades and a slate roof as part of the New York and Greenwood Lake Railway, an Erie Railroad operation, and was known as Glenwood. It had a two platform, two track station with the gas lights on the side of tracks. It later became a stop on New Jersey Transit Rail Operations Boonton Line, which runs from Hoboken Terminal to Hackettstown, and renamed Benson Street. Service was discontinued to Benson Street (along with Rowe Street in Bloomfield and Arlington in Kearny) on September 20, 2002 when the Montclair Connection was opened. Glen Ridge is serviced to the south at Glen Ridge station in the downtown commercial district.

In May 2009, the Benson Street station was sold to private owners by New Jersey Transit to rehabilitate the aging structure, and the new owners began stabilizing the structure which had been damaged by a fire in the 1980s and was in serious disrepair. The building is part of the Glen Ridge Historic District. On December 2, 2009, after a review from the New Jersey State Historical Preservation Organization, the new owners received approval to begin preliminary reconstruction of the former Benson Street Station. This rehabilitation project started by restructuring the basement of the building. By June 2010, the station had received new gutters, new walls and brand new roofing. Parts of the building's first floor paneling was kept, although the second story requires brand new paneling as it is converted into a new single family home. The restoration of the building was completed around May 2012. As of 2013 it is now a single family home, although one platform and track survive today.

See also
Operating Passenger Railroad Stations Thematic Resource (New Jersey)
National Register of Historic Places listings in Essex County, New Jersey

Bibliography

References

External links 

Glen Ridge, New Jersey
Railway stations in the United States opened in 1873
Railway stations closed in 2002
Former railway stations in New Jersey
Former NJ Transit stations
Former Erie Railroad stations
Railway stations on the National Register of Historic Places in New Jersey
Railway stations in Essex County, New Jersey
Repurposed railway stations in the United States